Auriculotherapy (also auricular therapy, ear acupuncture, and auriculoacupuncture) is a form of alternative medicine based on the idea that the ear is a micro system, which reflects the entire body, represented on the auricle, the outer portion of the ear. Conditions affecting the physical, mental or emotional health of the patient are assumed to be treatable by stimulation of the surface of the ear exclusively. Similar mappings are used by several modalities, including the practices of reflexology and iridology. These mappings are not based on or supported by any medical or scientific evidence, and are therefore considered to be pseudoscience.

History and development
French neurologist Paul Nogier invented auriculotherapy in 1957.  Nogier developed a phrenological method of projection of a fetal Homunculus on the ear and published what he called the "Vascular Autonomic Signal" which measured a change in the amplitude of the pulse.  That mechanism would only produce a signal upon the introduction of new information to the electromagnetic field of the patient.  Nogier cited a 'principle of matching resonance' which he could use the vascular autonomic signal to detect the active points of the auricular microsystem.

Nogier's Auricular acupuncture was introduced to China in 1958.

Richard Niemtzow, in 2001 developed a procedure he coined Battlefield Acupuncture in an attempt to research more efficient relief for phantom limb pain and chronic pain for veterans. Battlefield Acupuncture involves placing gold aiguille semi-permanent needles at up to five sites in the ears.  In 2018, the United States Department of Defense, the Veterans Center for Integrative Pain Management, and the Veterans Health Administration National Pain Management Program office completed a 3-year, $5.4 million acupuncture education and training program, which trained over 2800 providers in Battlefield Acupuncture. Retired U.S. Air Force flight surgeon Harriet Hall characterized the Department of Defense's use of acupuncture and auriculotherapy as an embarrassing "infiltration of quackery into military medicine", a waste of tax dollars, and a potential harm to patients.

Nogier points

The principles of auriculotherapy are contrary to known anatomy and physiology of the human body.
According to Nogier, the relevant structures include:
 Helix, the outer prominent rim of the auricle
 Antihelix, the elevated ridge anterior and parallel to the helix
 Triangular fossa, a triangular depression
 Scapha, the narrow curved depression between the helix and the antihelix
 Tragus, the small, curved flap in front of the auricle
 Antitragus, the small tubercle opposite to the tragus
 Concha, the hollow next to the ear canal

Nogier claims that various points located on the ear lobe are related to the head, and facial region, those on the scapha are related to the upper limbs, those on the antihelix and antihelix crura to the trunk and lower limbs and those in the concha are related to the internal organs.

Criticism 
A controlled crossover study of 36 patients failed to find any difference in two experiments. The study concluded that auriculotherapy is not an effective therapeutic procedure for chronic pain.

The first experiment compared the effects of stimulation of auriculotherapy points versus control points. A second experiment compared the stimulation of these points with a placebo control of no-stimulation. Using the McGill Pain Questionnaire, pain was not decreased at the points compared to the controls. Patients' reports of pain relief after auriculotherapy are due to placebo effects.

Also, during electrical stimulation, patients sometimes reported new pain in an unrelated part of the body. These referred sensations reinforce the pain relief produced by the placebo effect and may be part of the reason why the belief in auriculotherapy persists.

References

Acupuncture
Ear
Alternative medicine